Egon Flad (born 5 March 1964) is a German former professional footballer who played as a midfielder. After his professional career, he became active as a sports agent.

References

External links 
 
 

1964 births
Living people
German footballers
Association football midfielders
Bundesliga players
2. Bundesliga players
Stuttgarter Kickers players
FC St. Pauli players
FC Schalke 04 players
Tennis Borussia Berlin players